Interior with a Man Reading a Letter and a Woman Sewing is a c.1670-1674 oil on canvas painting by the Dutch artist Pieter de Hooch, now in the private Kremer Collection.

Sources
http://www.thekremercollection.com/pieter-de-hooch/
http://www.christies.com/lotfinder/lot/pieter-de-hooch-a-gentleman-reading-a-196701-details.aspx

Paintings by Pieter de Hooch
1670s paintings